Ángel Eduardo Reyna Martínez (born 19 September 1984) is a Mexican former professional footballer who played as an attacking midfielder.

Club career

Early career
Reyna came out of Club América's reserves but was given his professional debut at San Luis on 31 July 2005. He scored his first goal in the Primera División against Pumas UNAM on 5 February 2006. After his stint at San Luis, Reyna was signed by Club Necaxa.

Club América
On 18 December 2008, Reyna signed with Mexico City giants América, where he was "born" as a footballer, to be the new reinforcement for the Clausura 2009 season. His debut was against rivals Chivas Guadalajara in the InterLiga tournament where the match ended in a 1–1 draw.

For the Bicentenario 2010 season, after the shooting of Salvador Cabañas, Reyna became a reference player for the team and one of their top scorers, going on to score 7 goals in 16 appearances, including the 9000th goal in the history of the  Estadio Azteca in a 2–2 draw with Pachuca.

On 3 April 2011, Reyna scored his first hat-trick for América in a 5–4 win against Puebla in the Clausura 2011 tournament. On 1 May 2011 after scoring the second goal in the 91' minute in the 2–0 win over home-side Pumas, he scored his 13th league goal, thus becoming 
goalscoring champion of the Clausura 2011. He made team history by scoring 13 goals making him the second Mexican-born goalscoring champion, the last one being Cuauhtemoc Blanco in 1998, who scored 16 goals.

On 24 October 2011, Reyna was separated from the first team after saying that the team's captain, Aquivaldo Mosquera, was made of "water" and that América had a defense of "plastic". América was in the 16th position of the league and had one of the worst defenses in the tournament. After that declarations Reyna was separated of the team.

Monterrey
On 21 December 2011, Reyna joined C.F. Monterrey. He scored 4 goals and 3 assist in his first tournament with Monterrey. His team won the 2011-12 CONCACAF Champions League and was the runner-up for the Mexican Clausura 2012. He showed off on the CONCACAF following tournament by scoring a hat-trick in the 5–0 victory over Chorrillo F.C. in the opening match.

Loan to Pachuca
In 2013, Reyna was sent on loan to Pachuca where he scored five goals in 16 matches played.

Veracruz
On 17 June 2013, Veracruz reached an agreement with Monterrey to purchase Reyna. He had an outstanding start with the club by scoring 7 goals in only the first 3 league matches.

Guadalajara
On 29 May 2014, Reyna made a controversial move to Guadalajara for a fee of US$3.56 million. In August 2015, he was sent to train with the reserve squad after the club's president said he was not showing commitment with the team. On 10 March 2016, the club announced that they had reached an agreement to terminate his contract by mutual consent.

International career
In 2010, Reyna was called up by Javier Aguirre to play a series of friendlies with the Mexico national team against Bolivia national team, North Korea national team, and Iceland national team, where he appeared as a substitute in all three matches.

After being the Clausura 2011 top-goalscorer, he was called up by new national team coach José Manuel de la Torre for a series of friendlies against Ecuador and New Zealand national football team, and for the 2011 CONCACAF Gold Cup.

Career statistics

Club

International

International goals

Honours
Monterrey
CONCACAF Champions League: 2011–12

Guadalajara
Copa MX: Apertura 2015

Mexico
CONCACAF Gold Cup: 2011

Individual
Mexican Primera División Attacking Midfielder of the Tournament: Clausura 2011
Mexican Primera División Golden Boot: Clausura 2011

References

External links
 
 

1984 births
Living people
Mexican footballers
Mexico international footballers
Liga MX players
Ascenso MX players
Club León footballers
San Luis F.C. players
Club Necaxa footballers
Club América footballers
C.F. Monterrey players
C.D. Guadalajara footballers
Club Celaya footballers
C.F. Pachuca players
C.D. Veracruz footballers
Deportivo Toluca F.C. players
2011 CONCACAF Gold Cup players
2013 FIFA Confederations Cup players
CONCACAF Gold Cup-winning players
Association football defenders